"Aftermath" is a song by American alternative rock band R.E.M. It was released as the second single from their 13th studio album, Around the Sun (2004), on November 29, 2004.

Upon it release, "Aftermath" peaked at number 41 on the UK Singles Chart. The single also charted in the Netherlands and Sweden, peaking at numbers 44 and 59, respectively. Its music video, directed by Blue Leach and Peter Care, was filmed in several different locations, including the Hyatt Regency Hotel in San Francisco and the London Eye.

Track listing
 UK CD1
 "Aftermath" – 3:53
 "High Speed Train" (live in Athens, GA – rehearsals, 2004) – 4:59

 UK CD2
 "Aftermath"
 "So Fast, So Numb" (live in Athens, GA – rehearsals, 2004)
 "All the Right Friends" (live in Athens, GA – rehearsals, 2004)

Charts

Release history

References

R.E.M. songs
2004 singles
2004 songs
Dystopian music
Songs written by Michael Stipe
Songs written by Mike Mills
Songs written by Peter Buck
Song recordings produced by Michael Stipe
Song recordings produced by Mike Mills
Song recordings produced by Pat McCarthy (record producer)
Song recordings produced by Peter Buck
Warner Records singles